The 1937 Iowa State Cyclones football team represented Iowa State College of Agricultural and Mechanic Arts (later renamed Iowa State University) in the Big Six Conference during the 1937 college football season. In their first season under head coach James J. Yeager, the Cyclones compiled a 3–6 record (1–4 against conference opponents), tied for last place in the conference, and were outscored by opponents by a combined total of 161 to 50. They played their home games at State Field in Ames, Iowa.

Clarence Dee was the team captain. Two Iowa State players were selected as first-team all-conference players: guard Ed Bock and back Everett Kischer. Joe Truskowski and Cap Timm were the assistant coaches.

Schedule

References

Iowa State
Iowa State Cyclones football seasons
Iowa State Cyclones football